Kosar Ali (born 21 December 2003) is a British actress. Her debut role in the 2019 film Rocks leading her with a nomination at only 17 for Best Supporting Actress at the 74th British Academy Film Awards whilst also being the youngest recipient to win two British Independent Film Awards. She plays Victoire in Dangerous Liaisons on Starz.

Early and personal life
Ali lives in Newham, East London. She comes from a large British Somali Muslim family she had no acting experience before being street cast.

Career
Ali was discovered at her school when she was 13 years old by director Sarah Gavron and casting director Lucy Pardee as they were street casting for the film Rocks. The actresses were given a story outline, but no dialogue, and worked chronologically with Gavron and the writers, Theresa Ikoko and Claire Wilson. Occasionally the actresses were not even told the cameras were rolling; they naturally fell into conversations that were filmed without the director calling "action" or "cut". Gavron said that she even reshot a classroom scene which Ali told her was not working authentically.

The film premiered at the Toronto International Film Festival in 2019 and opened in Britain on 18 September 2020. For her work on this film Ali was nominated at the British Academy and Film awards in the Best Supporting Actress category being the first hijabi woman to be nominated for this. Ali also was one of the youngest actors to win two British Independent Film Awards (BIFA), for 'supporting actress' and 'most promising newcomer', in February 2021.

In 2021, Ali starred in a BBC comedy short, PRU, about unruly adolescents in the British system; the title stands for Pupil Referral Unit, an alternative schooling system for badly behaved students.

In 2022, she plays the leading role of Victoire in the Starz television series Dangerous Liaisons.

Accolades

Filmography

References

External links
 

Living people
Actresses from London
English Muslims
English people of Somali descent
People from the London Borough of Newham
2003 births